Winifred Christie (26 February 1882 – 8 February 1965) was a British pianist and composer best known as an advocate of the Moór-Duplex piano.  She was born in Stirling, Scotland.

The Moór-Duplex piano

Winifred Christie spent a significant portion of her career promoting the  Moór-Duplex piano, a double keyboard with a coupler between the two manuals (an octave apart), invented by Christie’s husband, Hungarian pianist, inventor, and composer Emanuel Moór. The Moór-Duplex aided in the playing of octaves, tenths, and even chromatic glissandos. The piano makers Steinway, Bechstein, and Bösendorfer all put the mechanism into their instruments. Christie performed on the instrument frequently in Europe and the United States and published (in collaboration with Moór) a manual of technical exercises for the instrument.

Recordings
Christie also recorded selectively for the Aeolian Vocalion and Winner recording labels.

World Première Performances
In concert, Christie premiered Edgar Bainton’s Concerto-Fantasia and, in New York, on February 23, 1916, the piano version of Charles Tomlinson Griffes' "The White Peacock" at New York's Punch and Judy Theatre.

In 1946, Christie founded and endowed the Westminster Central Music Library in London, England with a gift of £10,000 as a memorial to her late husband.

There is a scholarship fund in her name, at the Royal Academy of Music in London, given to keyboard students who perform particularly well at audition.

She died, aged 82, in London, England.

References

Further reading
The Emmanuel Moor New Duplex-Coupler Pianoforte, article by F. Gilbert Webb from The Proceedings of the Musical Association, 48th Sess., (1921 - 1922), pp. 91–97, Oxford University Press on behalf of the Royal Musical Association.

1882 births
1965 deaths
British classical pianists
British women pianists
20th-century British pianists
20th-century women pianists